Mr. Gae is the first EP by South Korean rapper Gary. The album was released on January 15, 2014, by Leessang Company and Loen Entertainment. The album was both critically and commercially successful, making it to 4 on the Gaon Album Chart.

Track listing

Chart positions

References

2014 EPs
Gary (rapper) albums